Fuller's Tavern is a historic inn and tavern located at Guilderland in Albany County, New York.  It was built about 1795 and is a two-story wood-frame house with a "saltbox" roof.  It opened as a tavern house in 1806 and is one of the few remaining inns of those built along the Great Western Turnpike in the late 18th century.

It was listed on the National Register of Historic Places in 1982.

References

Taverns in New York (state)
Drinking establishments on the National Register of Historic Places in New York (state)
Hotel buildings on the National Register of Historic Places in New York (state)
Commercial buildings completed in 1795
Buildings and structures in Albany County, New York
National Register of Historic Places in Albany County, New York
Taverns on the National Register of Historic Places in New York (state)